The Dreams We Have as Children – Live at the Royal Albert Hall is a charity live album by singer/guitarist Noel Gallagher in support of Teenage Cancer Trust. Gallagher recorded the album at a charity concert at the Royal Albert Hall in London on 27 March 2007.

Gallagher, best known as guitarist, main songwriter and occasional vocalist of English Britpop band Oasis played a set composing of primarily Oasis songs and was joined by fellow Oasis musician Gem Archer on guitar for the performance. The album's title stems from a lyric in the Oasis song "Fade Away", and Gallagher-penned Oasis songs make up the bulk of the songs recorded on the album. Past collaborator and friend of Gallagher Paul Weller (formerly of The Jam/Style Council) joined Gallagher on stage for two songs during the performance, too.

Five of the songs were released over the course of five days as free downloads on iTunes, followed by a physical CD give-away with The Sunday Times, which contained another eleven recordings from the performance. The album, with the additional five tracks previously released on iTunes, then went on sale digitally in the UK in its entirety the following day. The American iTunes eventually released it on 5 May 2009. 
The album was ineligible to chart on the Official UK Album Chart due to the absence of a commercially sold physical release.

Track listing
Digital Download Version
All songs written and composed by Noel Gallagher, except where noted.

Musicians
Noel Gallagher – vocals, acoustic guitar
Gem Archer – electric guitar, keyboard
Terry Kirkbride – percussion
Jane Oliver – cello
Rosie Danvers – cello, strings arrangements
Emma Owens, Sarah Chapman – viola
Ellie Stanford, Hayley Pomfrett, Natalia Bonner, Sally Jackson – violin
with
Paul Weller – acoustic guitar, vocals (Tracks 7 & 8)
Julian House - cover art
Gareth Johnson - mixing
Tommy D. - strings producer
Alan Branch - recording
Bruce Johnston - sound technician

References

External links
 

Charity albums
Noel Gallagher albums
Live albums recorded at the Royal Albert Hall
2009 live albums